Pumahuanca, Pumahuanja (possibly from Quechua puma cougar, puma, wank'a rock, "puma rock") or Yucay is a  mountain in the Urubamba mountain range in the Andes of Peru. It is located in the Cusco Region, on the boundary between Calca and Urubamba provinces, northwest of Urubamba. It lies northwest of Chicón and west of Capacsaya.

See also 
 Lares trek

References 

Mountains of Peru
Mountains of Cusco Region